Washington, D.C., is a political division coterminous with the District of Columbia, the federal district of the United States.  The enactment of the District of Columbia Home Rule Act in 1973 provided for an elected mayor for the first time in nearly a century. Starting in 1974, there have been thirteen elections for mayor and six people have held the office. The Democratic Party has immense political strength in the district. In each of the mayoral elections, the district has solidly voted for the Democratic candidate, with no margin less than 14 percentage points.

The mayor serves a four-year term. In 1994, residents approved a ballot measure limiting the mayor to two consecutive terms, despite simultaneously electing Marion Barry to his fourth term. In 2001, the D.C. Council repealed the measure, abolishing term limits for all elected positions.

Mayoral elections

Graph
The following graph shows the margin of victory of the Democratic Party over the runner-up in the 13 mayoral elections Washington, D.C., has held.

See also
 Elections in Washington, D.C.
 Electoral history of Marion Barry

Notes

References

Mayoral elections in Washington, D.C.